An intelligible form in philosophy refers to a form that can be apprehended by the intellect.  According to Ancient and Medieval philosophers, the intelligible forms are the things by which we understand. These are genera and species, insofar as genera or species such as "animal", "man" or "horse" are not found in sensible nature, except as individual man or horse.

Aristotle

The concept of the form as being what makes knowledge possible dates back to the time of Socrates. Aristotle is credited with making the distinction that led to the idea of the intelligible form. He argued that the mind is divided into the active and passive intellect, where the passive intellect receives the forms of things in order to be known, and the active intellect then turns possible knowledge into knowledge in act.

Plotinus
According to Plotinus, the power of the Demiurge (the 'craftsman' of the cosmos) is derived from the power of thought. When the demiurge creates, he governs the purely passive nature of matter by imposing a sensible form, which is an image of the intelligible forms contained as thoughts within the mind of the Demiurge, upon the pure passivity of matter. The form establishes its existence in the sensible realm merely through the thought of the Demiurge, which is nous.

Aquinas
In chapter 81 of the Compendium Theologiae, Saint Thomas Aquinas states that "the higher an intellectual substance is in perfection, the more universal are the intelligible forms it possesses. Of all the intellectual substances, consequently, the human intellect, which we have called possible, has forms of the least universality. This is the reason it receives its intelligible forms from sensible things." He further states that "a form must have some proportion to the potency which receives it. Therefore, since of all intellectual substances man’s possible intellect is found to be the closest to corporeal matter, its intelligible forms must, likewise, be most closely allied to material things.

References

Medieval philosophy